Alerrandro Barra Mansa Realino de Souza (born 12 January 2000), simply known as Alerrandro, is a Brazilian footballer who currently plays as a forward for Red Bull Bragantino.

Career

Red Bull Bragantino
On 29 November 2019 Red Bull Bragantino signed Alerrandro from Atlético Mineiro in a €3 million transfer.

Career statistics

Club

Notes

References

2000 births
Living people
Brazilian footballers
Brazil youth international footballers
Association football forwards
Campeonato Brasileiro Série A players
Clube Atlético Mineiro players
Red Bull Bragantino players
People from Lavras
Sportspeople from Minas Gerais